928 Hildrun (prov. designation:  or ), is a dark background asteroid, approximately  in diameter, located in the outer region of the asteroid belt. It was discovered on 23 February 1920, by astronomer Karl Reinmuth at the Heidelberg-Königstuhl State Observatory in southwest Germany. The X-type asteroid has a rotation period of 14.1 hours. It was named "Hildrun", a common German female name unrelated to the discoverer's contemporaries, that was taken from the almanac Lahrer Hinkender Bote.

Orbit and classification 

Hildrun is a non-family asteroid of the main belt's background population when applying the hierarchical clustering method to its proper orbital elements. It orbits the Sun in the outer asteroid belt (IIIb) at a distance of 2.7–3.6 AU once every 5 years and 7 months (2,027 days; semi-major axis of 3.13 AU). Its orbit has an eccentricity of 0.15 and an inclination of 18° with respect to the ecliptic. The body's observation arc begins at Heidelberg Observatory on 24 February 1920, the night after its official discovery observation.

Naming 

This minor planet was named "Hildrun", after a female name picked from the Lahrer Hinkender Bote, published in Lahr, southern Germany. A Hinkender Bote (lit. "limping messenger") was a very popular almanac, especially in the alemannic-speaking region from the late 17th throughout the early 20th century. The calendar section contains feast days, the dates of important fairs and astronomical ephemerides. For 19 May, the calendar gives "Hildrun" as the German name day analogue next to Potentia and Peter Cöl., the protestant and catholic entries in the calendar of saints, likely referring to Pudentiana and Pope Celestine V.

Reinmuth's calendar names 

As with 22 other asteroids – starting with 913 Otila, and ending with 1144 Oda – Reinmuth selected names from this calendar due to his many asteroid discoveries that he had trouble thinking of proper names. These names are not related to the discoverer's contemporaries. Lutz Schmadel, the author of the Dictionary of Minor Planet Names learned about Reinmuth's source of inspiration from private communications with Dutch astronomer Ingrid van Houten-Groeneveld, who worked as a young astronomer at Heidelberg.

Physical characteristics 

In both the Tholen- and SMASS-like taxonomy of the Small Solar System Objects Spectroscopic Survey (S3OS2), Hildrun is an X-type asteroid.

Rotation period and poles 

In May 2004, a rotational lightcurve of Hildrun was obtained from photometric observations by Brian Warner at the Palmer Divide Observatory  in Colorado. Lightcurve analysis gave a rotation period of  hours with a brightness variation of  magnitude. 

In 2016, a modeled lightcurves using photometric data from various sources, rendered a concurring sidereal period of  hours and two spin axes of (247.0°, −29.0°) and (86.0°, −63.0°) in ecliptic coordinates.

Diameter and albedo 

The Collaborative Asteroid Lightcurve Link derives an albedo of 0.0437 and a diameter of 66.59 km based on an absolute magnitude of 9.9.

Notes

References

External links 
 Dictionary of Minor Planet Names, Google books
 Asteroids and comets rotation curves, CdR – Geneva Observatory, Raoul Behrend
 Discovery Circumstances: Numbered Minor Planets (1)-(5000) – Minor Planet Center
 
 

000928
Discoveries by Karl Wilhelm Reinmuth
Named minor planets
19200223